This is a list of airports in Uzbekistan, sorted by location.

Uzbekistan, officially the Republic of Uzbekistan is a country in Central Asia; before 1991 it was part of the Soviet Union. It shares borders with Kazakhstan to the west and to the north, Kyrgyzstan and Tajikistan to the east, and Afghanistan and Turkmenistan to the south. 

Uzbekistan is divided into 12 regions, one autonomous republic, and one independent city. The provinces in turn are divided into 160 districts.



Airports

Airport names shown in bold have scheduled passenger service on commercial airlines.

Military Airports

See also

 Transport in Uzbekistan
 List of airports by ICAO code: U#UT - Tajikistan, Turkmenistan, Uzbekistan
 Wikipedia: WikiProject Aviation/Airline destination lists: Asia#Uzbekistan

References
 
  - includes IATA codes
 
 

 
Uzbekistan
Airports
Airlines
Uzbekistan